The United States Senior Men's Amateur Golf Championship is a national tournament for amateur golf competitors at least 55 years of age. It is operated by the United States Golf Association (USGA).

The tournament starts with 36 holes of stroke play, with the top 64 competitors advancing to the match play portion of the tournament. Golfers must have a USGA handicap index of 7.4 or lower to enter.

The tournament was founded in 1955, expanding on a tournament conducted by the U.S. Senior Golf Association (not affiliated with the USGA), which itself had grown from a senior amateur event at the Apawamis Club in 1905. Membership in this precursor tournament was limited, so the USGA agreed to start a national championship open to all senior golfers.

Senior Amateur contestants have been permitted to ride in carts since 1969.

Winners received exemptions to the following events: next year's U.S. Senior Open provided he still is an amateur; U.S. Amateur for the following two years; U.S. Mid-Amateur for this year and next year; and the next 10 years of the U.S. Senior Amateur.

Winners

Multiple winners
 3 wins: Lewis Oehmig
 2 wins: J. Clark Espie, Merrill L. Carlsmith, Dexter H. Daniels, Curtis Person, Sr., Dale Morey, William C. Campbell, Bill Hyndman, R. S. Williams, Clarence Moore, O. Gordon Brewer, Jr., Bill Shean, Jr., Kemp Richardson, Paul Simson

Future sites

Source

References

External links
Official site (most information is in the archive sections)

Amateur golf tournaments in the United States
Senior golf tournaments
Senior Men's Amateur Golf Championship